Gwen Lally  (born Gwendolin Rosalie Lally Tollandal Speck, 1 March 1882 – 14 April 1963) was an English pageant master, actor, theatre producer, playwright and lecturer. Lally regularly defied gender conventions and often chose to wear 'masculine' clothing that was typical of the era, such as trousers and a top hat. As the first woman pageant maker she produced many historical pageants for smaller towns and organisations as well as major city pageants which involved casts of thousands.

Early life 
Lally was born at 20 Perham Road, Fulham, London, to 'gentleman' Jocelyn Henry Speck and Rosalie Hughes Dalrymple. She was the eldest of three children. As a child she had a passion for Shakespeare and acting, and became an actress despite parental opposition.

Career 
In 1906, Lally began her career at His Majesty’s Theatre, London, under the management of Sir Herbert Beerbohm Tree. She also worked in touring theatre and music halls, and at the Old Vic. Lally only ever appeared on stage as a female once, in Dinner Together in 1914, and even then her character was a ‘male impersonator'. She claimed "the distinction of being the only actress who has never worn skirts on the stage".

As a director and producer she worked at repertory theatres in Leeds, where she had her own repertory company at the Little Theatre, and Westcliff on Sea. She encouraged town and village drama movements, lecturing on drama and critiquing student productions at Village Drama Society schools. In 1926 she directed the Village Drama Society's summer school in Bath and in York in 1927. She was also an adjudicator at the Yorkshire Women's Institute Drama Competitions. In 1924 she produced a performance of Shakespeare's Henry VIII with an all woman cast of about 100 members of the Westerham, Brasted and Crookham Hill Women's Institutes in Kent.

Lally wrote two plays, acting in both of them: Pierrot Philanders (1917) and The Great Moment (1918).

Lally is best known as a pageant maker, and the first woman to succeed in this work. Other well known pageant masters were Louis N. Parker and Frank Lascelles. The pageant master was responsible for the production and coordination of casts of performers and musicians who were often volunteers. Lally produced many pageants including:

 Pageant of Poole, Dorset (1952): involved 1500 performers
 Pageant of Dudley (1951)
Malvern Pageant, Worcestershire (1951)
 Pageant of Birmingham:  the centenary of the granting of the City of Birmingham's Charter of Incorporation in which 8000 people took part (1938)
 Pageant of England, Langley Park, Bucks. (1935)
 Runnymede Pageant (1934)
 Battle Abbey Pageant, Sussex (1932)
 Tewkesbury Pageant (1931)
 The Spirit of Warwickshire, Warwick Castle (1930)
 Pageant of Ashdown Forest, Kent (1929)
Westcroft Park, Woking, Surrey (1928)
Women's Institute village pageant, Rillington, near Malton, North Yorkshire (1927)
Shere Pageant, Surrey (1925)
Pageant of Kent, Lullingstone Castle, Kent (1924)

Gwen Lally was known for "her powerful personality and striking figure". In her opinion, pageant making brought together people of all classes and types and promoted friendships between enemies. As a pioneer in the field of pageant making she was appointed an Officer of the Order of the British Empire in the 1954 New Year Honours. She died on 14 April 1963 in Tunbridge Wells, Kent.

References

Further reading 
 Angela Bartie, Linda Fleming, Mark Freeman, Tom Hulme, Alexander Hutton & Paul Readman (2019) "‘History taught in the pageant way’: education and historical performance in twentieth-century Britain." History of Education. 48:2, 156-179,

External links 

 Coggrave, Sarah. The Fascinating World of the Pageant Masters King's Collections (2018). Includes a photo of Gwen Lally.
 Werner, Sarah. a Henry for her time  Folger Shakespeare Library (2013). Pictures of Gwen Lally playing Henry V.
 King's College London. The Redress of the Past: Historical Pageants in Britain.
 National Portrait Gallery. Fourteen portraits of Gwen Lally.
 Gwen Lally's plays on the Great War Theatre website
 Sugg Ryan, Deborah. Gwen Lally, Pageant Master. English Heritage website
Papers relating to Gwen Lally held in University of Bristol Theatre Collection

English women dramatists and playwrights
20th-century English dramatists and playwrights
20th-century English actresses
Officers of the Order of the British Empire
1882 births
1963 deaths